Fantaisie brillante sur des motifs de V. Bellini (also Souvenir du Théâtre Italien: 1re. and 2me. fantaisie brillante sur des motifs de l'Opéra  Norma et Sonnambula) both in E♭ major, Op. 22. They are a one-movement piano composition written by French virtuose pianist Alexandre Goria in 1846 and first published in Mainz the following year by B. Schott Sohne Dedicated to Madame L. Pillot, de Douai.

See also
List of compositions by Alexandre Goria

References

External links

Compositions by Alexandre Goria
1846 compositions
Fantasias (music)
Compositions for solo piano
Piano compositions in the Romantic era